Ballaglass Glen Halt (Manx: Stadd Ghlion Valley Glass) is an intermediate stopping place on the northerly section of the Manx Electric Railway on the Isle of Man.

Location

The halt is located at the entrance to the national glen of the same name and is served only by rail, there being no direct road access to this location.

Facilities
A wooden waiting shelter featuring a sprung gate which is to stop sheep from getting trapped inside it, such is the rural nature of the Manx Electric Railway and its environs. The current shelter was erected in 1987 replacing an earlier version of corrugated iron construction.

Substation
Nearby in a southerly direction is the sub-station building which can be seen through the trees from passing trams; today the majority of this building houses a private dwelling complete with swimming pool in the old boiler house, although a small sub-station still exists on site.

Route

Also
List of Manx Electric Railway stations

References

Sources

 Manx Electric Railway Stopping Places (2002) Manx Electric Railway Society
 Island Images: Manx Electric Railway Pages (2003) Jon Wornham
 Official Tourist Department Page (2009) Isle Of Man Heritage Railways

Railway stations in the Isle of Man
Manx Electric Railway
Railway stations opened in 1899
1899 establishments in the Isle of Man